Hà Tiên may refer to:

Hà Tiên, a city in Kiên Giang Province
Hà Tiên Province, former province of Vietnam
Hà Tiên District, former district of Vietnam
Hà Tiên Islands
Principality of Hà Tiên, Hà Tiên Protectorate or Hà Tiên trấn